Frome Billet is a former village in Dorset, just to the north of West Stafford.

It is mentioned in the Domesday Book. There is slight archaeological evidence of a mediaeval settlement. It is now represented only by Stafford House.

References

History of Dorset
Former populated places in Dorset